SS. Leafield was a Canadian steel-hulled cargo ship built by the Strand Stepway Company in Sunderland, England, in 1892. Originally registered in Newcastle upon Tyne, England, she was sold after about a year to the Algoma Central Steamship Line and brought to Canada, where she operated on the Great Lakes, carrying coal, grain, and iron ore.

On the night of 17 August 1912, Leafield was carrying ore to Midland, Ontario, Canada, when she ran aground on a rocky islet in Georgian Bay near Beausoleil Island, Ontario. Salvage and repairs cost $15,000, and the ship was out of service for two months.

Her entire crew of 18 perished. A search found no trace of the ship or crew. As of 2022, Leafield's wreck has not been located.

References

Maritime incidents in 1912
Maritime incidents in 1913
Shipwrecks of Lake Superior
1892 ships
Ships built on the River Wear
Ships lost with all hands